Bye-Bye is a 1995 French drama film directed by Karim Dridi. It was screened in the Un Certain Regard section at the 1995 Cannes Film Festival.

Cast
 Sami Bouajila – Ismael
 Nozha Khouadra – Yasmine
 Philippe Ambrosini – Ludo
 Ouassini Embarek – Mouloud
 Sofiane Madjid Mammeri – Rhida (as Sofiane Mammeri)
 Jamila Darwich-Farah – La tante
 Benhaïssa Ahouari – L'oncle
 Moussa Maaskri – Renard
 Frédéric Andrau – Jacky
 Christian Mazucchini – Yvon
 Bernard Llopis – Popaul
 Marie Borowski – Bobo
 André Neyton – Marcel
 Emmanuel-Georges Delajoie – Mabrouk
 Bakhta Tayeb – La grand-mère
 Farida Melaab – Malika

References

External links

1995 films
French drama films
1990s French-language films
1995 drama films
Films directed by Karim Dridi
Films set in Marseille
1990s French films